The twenty-fourth season of the American crime-drama television series Law & Order: Special Victims Unit was ordered on February 27, 2020, by NBC, which premiered on September 22, 2022, with a crossover premiere event.
The season will be produced by Wolf Entertainment and Universal Television; the new showrunner is David Graziano replacing Warren Leight.
Molly Burnett was announced to join the cast on July 24.
On August 24, Kelli Giddish confirmed she would be leaving through the season.

Cast and characters

Main
 Mariska Hargitay as Captain Olivia Benson
 Kelli Giddish as Senior Detective Amanda Rollins (episodes 1–9)
 Ice-T as Sergeant Odafin "Fin" Tutuola
 Peter Scanavino as Assistant District Attorney Dominick "Sonny" Carisi, Jr.
 Octavio Pisano as Junior Detective Joe Velasco
 Molly Burnett as Junior Detective Grace Muncy (episodes 7–present)

Crossover stars from Law & Order 

 Jeffrey Donovan as Senior Detective Frank Cosgrove
 Mehcad Brooks as Junior Detective Jalen Shaw
 Camryn Manheim as Lieutenant Kate Dixon

Crossover stars from Law & Order: Organized Crime 

 Christopher Meloni as Senior Detective Elliot Stabler
 Danielle Moné Truitt as Sergeant Ayanna Bell
 Ainsley Seiger as Junior Detective Jet Slootmaekers

Recurring

 Terry Serpico as Chief Tommy McGrath
 Betty Buckley as Trial Division Chief Assistant District Attorney Lorraine Maxwell
 Frances Turner as Attorney Elaine Samuels
 Erin Anderson as Attorney April Andrews
 Ryan Buggle as Noah Porter-Benson
 Charlotte Cabell as Jesse Murphy Rollins
 Beatrice Mallow as Billie Rollins
 Maurice Compte as Captain Mike Duarte
 Adam Petchel as Elias Olsen
 Robbie Williams as Mason Carter
 Rock Kohli as Rav Singh
 Aditi Yadav as Priya Singh
 Anjali Bhimani as Nisha Singh

 Anthony Patellis as Judge Lonnie Dukakis
 Frank Wood as Medical Examiner Abel Truman
 Quentin Nguyen-Duy as Officer Eric Tran
 Aida Turturro as Judge Felicia Catano
 Stephen C. Bradbury as Judge Colin McNamara
 Adrian Alvarado as Detective Ray Fernandez
 Kadia Saraf as US Attorney Anya Avital
 Kevin Kane as Detective Terry Bruno
 Rigo Garay as Hector Suárez 
 J.C MacKenzie as Attorney Richard Pace
 Jasmine Batchelor as Detective Tonie Churlish

Notable guests
 Dana Wheeler-Nicholson as Lilah Jones
 James Carpinello as Paul Greco
 Lola Glaudini as Lena Hess
 Brooke Bloom as Maggie D'Angelo
 Jordan Belfi as Spencer Lewis
 Dave Shalansky as Ethan Schmidt
 Anna Belknap as Ginny McCann
 Bradley Whitford as Pence Humphreys 
 Nancy Travis as Winifred "Winnie" Olsen

Episodes

Ratings

References

24
2022 American television seasons
2023 American television seasons